Virginijus Dambrauskas (born 23 April 1962) is a Lithuanian chess player who holds the title of International Master (IM) and International Correspondence Chess Grandmaster (GM, 2018). He is winner of Lithuanian Chess Championship (1992).

Biography 
Virginijus Dambrauskas was a multiple participant of the Lithuanian Chess Championships, in which he won two medals: gold (1992) and silver (1996, shared 1st-2nd places with Vytautas Šlapikas and behind of him in additional indicators). 

Virginijus Dambrauskas played for Lithuania in the Chess Olympiad:
 In 1992, at reserve board in the 30th Chess Olympiad in Manila (+0, =2, -1).

Virginijus Dambrauskas played for Lithuania in the European Team Chess Championship:
 In 1992, at reserve board in the 10th European Team Chess Championship in Debrecen (+0, =0, -1).

Virginijus Dambrauskas also five times played for Lithaunian chess clubs in European Chess Club Cups (1996, 2006-2009). He was awarded the FIDE International Master (IM) title.

Since 1978, Virginijus Dambrauskas has been active participated in correspondence chess tournaments. The her main achievements are two silver medals of the 5th and 6th European Team Correspondence Chess Championships as part of the Lithuanian team (competitions were held from 1999 to 2004 and from 2004 to 2008). In 2018, he was awarded the ICCF International Correspondence Chess Grandmaster (GM) title. He is the Vice President of the Lithuanian Correspondence Chess Federation.

Virginijus Dambrauskas is in the civil service as a senior inspector of the Information Systems Center of the Customs Department of the Ministry of Finance of Lithuania.

References

External links 

1962 births
Living people
Chess International Masters
Lithuanian chess players
Soviet chess players
Correspondence chess grandmasters
Chess officials